SQL:2008 is the sixth revision of the ISO and ANSI standard for the SQL database query language. It was formally adopted in July 2008. The standard consists of 9 parts which are described in detail in SQL.  The next iteration is SQL:2011

New features
Additions to the Foundation include 
enhanced MERGE and DIAGNOSTIC statements,
the TRUNCATE TABLE statement,
comma-separated WHEN clauses in a CASE expression,
INSTEAD OF database triggers,
partitioned JOIN tables,
support for various XQuery regular expression/pattern-matching features, and
enhancements to derived column names.

Documentation 
The SQL standards documentation is not freely available but may be purchased from the ISO as ISO/IEC 9075(1-4,9-11,13,14):2008.

Claims of conformance
The minimum level of conformance to SQL:2008 that a product can claim is called "Core SQL:2008" and is limited to definitions specified in two parts of the standard: the Foundation and the Information and Definition Schemas.

See also
Wikibook SQL

References

External links
Freely downloadable drafts of this standard

 
Declarative programming languages
Query languages
Computer-related introductions in 2008